The 2014 Men's U23 South American Volleyball Championship was the 1st edition of the tournament, organised by South America's governing volleyball body, the Confederación Sudamericana de Voleibol (CSV).

Competing nations

Competition format
The 2014 Men's U23 South American Volleyball Championship will consist in a single Round-Robin pool between the six teams, the champion will be determined from the ranking after the round.

Competition

Final standing

All-Star Team

Most Valuable Player

Best Setter

Best Opposite

Best Outside Hitters

Best Middle Blockers

Best Libero

References

External links
CSV official website

Men's South American Volleyball Championships
S
Volleyball
V